The 2023 Copa América de Beach Soccer (known natively in Spanish as the Copa América de Futbol Playa) was the fourth edition of the Copa América de Beach Soccer, the international beach soccer competition organised by CONMEBOL for the men's national teams of South America. It was held in Rosario, Argentina between 11 and 19 March 2023.

For the first time, the tournament acted as the South American qualification for the FIFA Beach Soccer World Cup following CONMEBOL's decision to determine its representatives in the World Cup via the Copa America instead of its specific qualifying tournament that ran until 2021. The top three teams qualified for the 2023 FIFA Beach Soccer World Cup to be held in the United Arab Emirates.

Brazil won their third Copa América Beach Soccer title by beating the hosts Argentina 13–5 in the final. The defending champions Paraguay was unable to retain their title after losing in the semi-finals to Brazil, leading them to play the third place match against Colombia, which they also lost by a 5–7 score. Champions Brazil, runners-up Argentina and third place Colombia qualified for the 2023 FIFA Beach Soccer World Cup.

Teams
Teams representing all 10 members of CONMEBOL will take part.

Venue
Argentina was named as host country of the tournament at the CONMEBOL Council meeting held on 30 September 2022. Rosario was confirmed as host city by the Argentine Football Association on 14 February 2023, with the Estadio Arena, located within the Predio Ferial Parque Independencia, as the venue for all the matches.

Squads

Each national team had to enter a squad of a maximum of 12 and a minimum of 10 players, including at least of two goalkeepers (Regulations Article 47).

Draw
The draw to split the ten teams into two groups of five took place at 12:00 PYST (UTC–3) on 16 February 2023 at CONMEBOL headquarters in Luque, Paraguay, under the following procedure:

The teams were seeded based on their final ranking in the previous edition of the tournament in 2022 (shown in brackets).

Initially, two teams were automatically assigned to position one of the groups:

 to Group A: as the hosts, 
 to Group B: as the last champions, 

The remaining eight teams were split into four pots of two based on their seeding, in order from the highest seeds placed in Pot 1, down to the lowest seeds placed in Pot 4. From each pot, the first team drawn was placed into Group A and the second team drawn was placed into Group B.

The draw resulted in the following groups:

Match officials
On 23 February 2023, CONMEBOL announced a total of 20 referees appointed for the tournament.

 Mariano Romo
 Carlos Maidana
 Pablo Defelippi
 Jaimito Suárez
 Noe Parra
 Lucas Estevão
 Luciano Andrade
 Mayron Dos Reis
 Cristian Galaz
 Ricardo Zúñiga
 Jorge Iván Gómez
 Ferley Fuentes
 Jean Villamar
 Brando Amay
 Micke Palomino
 Alex Valdivieso
 Christian Altez
 Aecio Fernández
 Luis Coy
 Gerand Rivas

Group stage
The top two teams of each group advanced to the semi finals. The teams finishing in third through fifth proceeded to play in consolation matches against the teams finishing in the same position in the other group to determine their final rank.

Each team earns three points for a win in regulation time, two points for a win in extra time, one point for a win in a penalty shoot-out, and no points for a defeat (Regulations Article 19).

If two or more teams are equal on points, their rankings are determined as follows (Regulations Article 20):

All match times are in local time, ART (UTC−3), as listed by CONMEBOL in the schedule published after the draw. 14 March is allocated as a rest day.

Group A

Group B

Final stages
All match times are in local time, ART (UTC−3), as listed by CONMEBOL.

Bracket

Semi-finals

Ninth place play-off

Seventh place play-off

Fifth place play-off

Third place play-off

Final

Qualified teams for FIFA Beach Soccer World Cup
The following three teams from CONMEBOL qualify for the 2023 FIFA Beach Soccer World Cup in the United Arab Emirates.

1 Bold indicates champions for that year. Italic indicates hosts for that year.

Final ranking

References

External links
 at copaamerica.com

2023
2023 in Argentine football
2023 in beach soccer
Copa América de Beach Soccer
2023 in South American football